Dzvinka Matiyash (Ukrainian: Дзвінка Валентинівна Матіяш; born 1978) is a Ukrainian prose writer, children's author, poet and translator.

Early life and education 
Dzvinka Matiyash was born on November16, 1978, in Kyiv. One of her sisters is the poet Bohdana Matiyash. From 1995 to 2002 she studied literature at the National University of Kyiv-Mohyla Academy, then continued her education with postgraduate studies at the European Collegium of Polish and Ukrainian Universities (2002–2006) in Lublin, Poland.

Career 
Dzvinka Matiyash debuted in 2005 with a meditative book of prose titled A Requiem for November and has since published works for adults and children. Her books have received two nominations for the BBC Ukrainian Book of the Year title and the French translation of Stories of Roses, Rain and Salt by Justine Donche-Horetska was nominated for the 2020 Drahomán Prize. Works by Matiyash have been translated to Polish, French, Chinese, English, German, Italian and Serbian.

Matiyash's writing is praised for stylistically masterful monologues which invoke the tradition started by Yuriy Izdryk and Taras Prokhasko. Her prose is considered clear and often touching upon the philosophical, with themes of beauty, goodness and God. She draws inspiration from Catholic mysticism.

She translates from Polish, Belarusian, Russian and English. Among her published book translations are works by poets Andrei Khadanovich and Jan Twardowski as well as texts by the Polish journalist Ryszard Kapuściński.

Publications 

 Реквієм для листопаду ("A Requiem for November"), 2005
 Роман про батьківщину ("A Novel about My Homeland"), 2006
 Казки П’ятинки, 2010
 Історії про троянди, дощ і сіль ("Stories About Roses, Rain and Salt"), 2012
 День Сніговика, 2014
 Марта з вулиці Святого Миколая, 2015
 Перше Різдво, 2016
 Дорога святого Якова, 2017
 Подарунок від святого Миколая, 2018
 Мене звати Варвара, 2021
 Histoires sur les roses, la pluie et le sel, translator Justine Donche-Horetska, Paris: les Éditions Bleu & jaune, DL 2020.

References 

Ukrainian children's writers
Ukrainian translators
Ukrainian women poets
21st-century Ukrainian women writers
Translators from Polish
1978 births
Living people
National University of Kyiv-Mohyla Academy alumni
Translators from Belarusian
Translators from Russian